is a Japanese photographer.

According to Michael Hoppen Gallery, Naitō was born in Tokyo in 1938. He graduated from Waseda University in applied sciences and trained as a research scientist. A keen interest in the folkloric traditions of Japan led him to pursue a career in photography. His work on the ethnological customs of the region of Tōhoku became the focus of his 1970s series: Ba Ba Bakuhatsu (Grandma Explosion).
 
Early on in his career, Naitō photographed the mummies of Buddhist priests who had died fasting for the salvation of starving farmers in Dewa Sanzan and then started making photographs that focused on the folk religions and ethnology of Tōhoku. In this body of work (1968–1970), Naitō portrays itako, female shamans who invoke the spirits of the dead. Female shamanism used to be widespread within Japan; today it is limited to this region where the more esoteric sides of Eastern religion are still practiced. These female shamans photographed starkly by Naitō are celebrating death. They mourn the dead by performing rituals and dancing all night to evoke the spirits of the deceased. These women are exuberant and celebrate death not life. Naitō pays homage to this time-old tradition with his bright flash, graphically illuminating the characters he depicts.  As he observed: "The vitality of women comes from the earth. They embrace everything like goddesses and the title Ba Ba Bakuhatsu (Grandma Explosion) came to my mind naturally."
 
Tōno Monogatari focuses on a similar subject matter in the town of Tōno, in Iwate Prefecture. The title echoes that of a popular 1910 book by folklorist Yanagita Kunio. Again using an open flash and mostly working at night, Naitō's images endow people and objects alike with a mystical aura. He weaves ancient tales into contemporary photographic narratives.
 
Naitō received the New Artist Award from the Japan Photo Critics Association in 1966. He participated in "New Japanese Photography" (The Museum of Modern Art, New York) in 1974 and "Beyond Japan" (London Barbican Art Centre) in 1991. He then had a solo exhibition "Masatoshi Naito Photography and Folklore"（Kichijoji Art Museum）in 2009. Naitō won second prize in the Domon Ken Award for his book Dewa Sanzan and Shugen, Kosei Publishing, 1982. Other books of photographs include Miira shinko no kenkyū (Study of the Mummy Faith), Daiwa Shobō, 1974 and Tōhoku no sei to sen (Tōhoku Sacred and Profane), Hosei University Press, 2007.

References

Japanese photographers
1938 births
Living people
Street photographers